Záhoří is a municipality in Písek District in the South Bohemian Region of the Czech Republic. It has about 800 inhabitants.

Administrative parts
The municipality is made up of villages of Dolní Záhoří, Horní Záhoří, Jamný, Kašina Hora, Svatonice and Třešně.

Geography
It lies in the Tábor Uplands.

Economy
Most of the people are employed in Písek, smaller number of them in local agricultural business.

Transport
Záhoří is situated on the railway line from Písek to Tábor and on a bus line from Písek to Milevsko. The train station Záhoří is located in Svatonice part of Záhoří.

Sights
In Horní Záhoří there is the Church of Saint Michael. The first mention of the church is from 1351, but it was destroyed during the Thirty Years' War and completely rebuilt in 1639. Modifications were made in the 18th and 19th centuries.

References

External links

Villages in Písek District